Eastern is an unincorporated community located in Floyd County, Kentucky, United States.

Education
Three Floyd County Schools are located in Eastern:
 James A. Duff Elementary School
 Allen Central Middle School
 Allen Central High School

A new Floyd Central High School is nearing completion in the community. It will replace both Allen Central High and South Floyd High School, and is expected to open in the fall of 2017. At that time, Allen Central will be converted into a technical education hub for the Floyd County school district.

Eastern has a public library, a branch of the Floyd County Public Library.

Notable people
 Sportscaster Kenny Rice, known nationally for his horse racing reporting, grew up in Eastern.

References

Unincorporated communities in Floyd County, Kentucky
Unincorporated communities in Kentucky